Sprawlgangs & Megacorps is a supplement published by Iron Crown Enterprises (I.C.E.) in 1990 for the cyberpunk near-future science fiction role-playing game Cyberspace.

Contents
Sprawlgangs & Megacorps is a supplement describing 20 street gangs known as "sprawlgangs", 16 ruthless megacorporations that wield enormous power, five organizations, and seven notable non-player characters.

Publication history
I.C.E. published the cyberpunk role-playing game Cyberspace in 1989. The game's first supplement, Sprawlgangs & Megacorps, is a 64-page book written by Terry Amthor and Kevin Barrett, with both interior and cover art by Janet Aulisio.

Reviews
White Wolf #23 (Oct./Nov. 1990, p. 54)
Games Review, Issue 9 (June 1990, p. 60)

References

Cyberspace (role-playing game)
Role-playing game supplements introduced in 1990
Science fiction role-playing game supplements